Joseph Congdon may refer to:
 Joseph Whipple Congdon, American botanist
 Joseph M. Congdon, American lawyer and politician from New York